Aracy de Almeida  (August 19, 1914 – June 20, 1988) was a Brazilian singer, known as a famous artist of the Golden Age of Brazilian radio. Her 1950 album Noel Rosa was voted by Rolling Stone one of the greatest Brazilian albums of all time.

References

1914 births
1988 deaths
Place of birth missing
20th-century Brazilian women singers
20th-century Brazilian singers
Women in Latin music